DGB may stand for:

German Trade Union Confederation
German Federation of the Deaf
DGB Financial Group, a Korean banking holding company
Diy-Gid-Biy, a group of archeological sites in northern Cameroon and Nigeria
Disinformation Governance Board, an advisory board of the United States Department of Homeland Security
Dirección General de Bachillerato, an educational program of Mexico encompassing the Preparatoria Federal